Ange-Étienne-Xavier Poisson de La Chabeaussière (4 December 1752 – 10 September 1820) was an 18th–19th-century French writer and playwright.

Biography 
Like Nicolas Dalayrac, of whom he was an episodic librettist, La Chabeaussière served among the bodyguards of "Monsieur" (comte d'Artois). He wrote several plays.

The Catéchisme républicain philosophique et moral which he wrote, was chosen after a contest held 9 pluviôse an II, as legal official catechism for schools during the French Directory.

Works

Book 
 Catéchisme républicain, philosophique et moral, an II de la République.

Librettos 
 L'Éclipse totale, opéra comique in one act and in verse, music by Nicolas Dalayrac, created 7 March 1782 by the troupe of Comédie Italienne at Hôtel de Bourgogne, Paris.
 Le Corsaire, comedy in three acts and in verse, mingled with ariettes, music by Nicolas Dalayrac, created 7 March 1783, at Cour of Versailles then given 17 March 1783 at Hôtel de Bourgogne.
 Azémia ou le Nouveau Robinson , comedy in three acts and in verse mingled with ariettes, music by Micolas Dlayrac, created 17 October 1786 at Cour of Fontainebleau. Became Azémia ou les Sauvages once set in prose, given 3 May 1787 at Opéra-Comique (salle Favart).
 Le Corsaire algérien ou le Combat naval, comedy in one act and in prose, music by Nicolas Dalayrac, created 13 messidor an I, at Opéra-Comique (salle Favart).
Gulistan ou le Hulla de Samarcande, comedy in three acts and in prose mingled with ariettes, in collaboration with Charles-Guillaume Étienne, music by Nicolas Dalayrac, created 8 vendémiaire an XIV at Opéra-Comique (Théâtre Feydeau).

Theatre 
 Lamentine ou les Tapouis, tragi-comic play in two acts and in verse, in collaboration with MM. Dalayrac, T. A. and M., created 12 August 1779 at Théâtre-Italien.
 Les Maris corrigés, comedy in three acts and in verse, created 7 August 1781 at Théâtre-Italien.

Songs 
 Couplets pour la fête de Madame la Comtesse de M., chantés par Mademoiselle sa Fille, lyrics by M.de la Chabeaussière (écuyer), music by M. Dalayrac, 1784 
Chant martial for victory party, music by François-Joseph Gossec, premiered 20 prairial an IV (29 May 1796).

Musical accompagnements 
 Romance du Chevrier (current Plaisir d'amour ), lyrics from Célestine, short story by Jean-Pierre Claris de Florian, with a tune by Jean Paul Égide Martini, publishing of a guitar accompaniment in 1785.

Iconography 
De La Chabeaussière was portrayed by
 Joseph Ducreux, 1795 Salon, #.234.
 Robert Lefèvre, 1804 Salon, #.391.
 Jacques-Augustin-Catherine Pajou 1819 Salon, #.806. In 1943, it was acquired in public sale by the National Museum of Versailles and Trianon.
 He also appeared on a print Une Soirée chez la princesse Constance de Salm among 38 other literary and artistic personalities of the Salon od Princesse de Salm.

Notes and references 
Notes

External links 
 Ange-Étienne-Xavier Poisson de La Chabeaussière on Data.bnf.fr

1752 births
Writers from Paris
1820 deaths
18th-century French dramatists and playwrights
19th-century French dramatists and playwrights
18th-century French writers
18th-century French male writers